William Allison may refer to:

 William Allison (Assemblyman) (1827–1882), member of the Wisconsin State Assembly
 William B. Allison (1829–1908), early leader of the Iowa Republican Party
 William D. Allison (1861–1923), American lawman
 William Henry Allison (1838–1934), Canadian politician and school lands commissioner
 William O. Allison, (1849 1924), early director of National Reserve Bank of the City of New York in 1909
 William Outis Allison (1849–1924), mayor of Englewood Cliffs, New Jersey
 Alice Muriel Williamson (1858–1933), who wrote under the pen name William Allison
 William Race Allison (1812–1865), Australian politician and landowner

See also
 Allison Williams (disambiguation)